Baccano! is a light novel series written by Ryohgo Narita and illustrated by Katsumi Enami. The series, often told from multiple points of view, follows many loosely connected people brought together by immortality. The events are mostly set within a fictional United States during various time periods, most notably the Prohibition-era.

Originally, Narita entered the first novel into ASCII Media Works' ninth Dengeki Novel Prize in 2002 and the novel won the Gold Prize, placing third. The first novel was released in February 2003 under ASCII Media Works' Dengeki Bunko imprint, and as of December 8, 2012, nineteen novels have been released. In addition, one novel accompanied the first drama CD, released on March 31, 2006, and two gaiden novels were released in parts with DVDs of the anime adaption, released from October 24, 2007 to May 28, 2008. Daewon C.I. licensed the Korean-language release of the series in South Korea and releases the novels under their Newtype Novels imprint.  A Chinese-language release in Taiwan and Hong Kong is licensed by the Taiwan branch of Kadokawa Media.

The novels have been adapted into an anime series, directed by Takahiro Omori, two drama CDs, a video game and a two volume manga.

Volume list

Light novels

Additional novels 
 1931? The Grand Punk Railroad , released March 31, 2003 with the 1931  The Grand Punk Railroad drama CD. Later expanded into 1931 Another Junk Railroad: Special Express.
 193X A man in the killer, released in five parts from October 24, 2007 to February 27, 2008 with DVDs 1 to 5. Later expanded into 1932 Summer: Man in the Killer.
 193X The Time Of the Oasis, released in three parts March 26, 2008 to May 28, 2008 with DVDs 6 to 8. Later expanded into 1931 Winter: The Time of the Oasis.

References 

Baccano!
Baccano!